Euraphia is a genus of star barnacles in the family Chthamalidae. There are at least three described species in Euraphia.

Species
These species belong to the genus Euraphia:
 Euraphia calcareobasis (Henry, 1957)
 Euraphia devaneyi Foster & Newman, 1987
 Euraphia hembeli Conrad, 1837

References

Barnacles